Rio or Río is the Portuguese, Spanish, and Maltese word for "river". The term also exists in Italian, but is largely obsolete and used in a poetical or literary context to mean "stream"; the standard Italian word for "river" is "fiume". When spoken on its own, the word often means Rio de Janeiro, a major city in Brazil.

Rio or Río may also refer to:

Geography

Brazil
 Rio de Janeiro
 Rio do Sul, a town in the state of Santa Catarina, Brazil

Mexico
 Río Bec, a Mayan archaeological site in Mexico
 Río Bravo, Tamaulipas, a city in Mexico

United States
 Rio, a location in Deerpark, New York, US
 Rio, Florida, a census-designated place in Martin County, US
 Rio, Georgia, an unincorporated community in Spalding County, US
 Rio, Illinois, a village in Knox County, US
 Rio, Virginia, a community in Albemarle County, US
 Rio, West Virginia, a village in Hampshire County, US
 Rio, Wisconsin, a village in Columbia County, US
 El Río, Las Piedras, Puerto Rico, a barrio
 Río Arriba, Añasco, Puerto Rico, a barrio
 Río Arriba, Arecibo, Puerto Rico, a barrio
 Río Arriba, Fajardo, Puerto Rico, a barrio
 Río Arriba, Vega Baja, Puerto Rico, a barrio
 Río Abajo, Ceiba, Puerto Rico, a barrio
 Río Abajo, Cidra, Puerto Rico, a barrio
 Río Abajo, Humacao, Puerto Rico, a barrio
 Río Abajo, Utuado, Puerto Rico, a barrio
 Río Abajo, Vega Baja, Puerto Rico, a barrio
 Rio Creek, Wisconsin, an unincorporated community in Kewaunee County, US
 Rio Grande Valley (Texas), a location in south Texas
 RIO Washingtonian Center (also stylized as rio), a shopping center in Gaithersburg, Maryland, US

Elsewhere
 Rio, Italy, a municipality on the island of Elba in Tuscany
 Rio, Greece, a community in suburban Patras
 Río Bravo, Suchitepéquez, a town in Guatemala
 Rio Grande (disambiguation)
 Río Muni, the mainland of Equatorial Guinea
 Rio Tuba, a barrio in the province of Palawan, Philippines

People

Given name or nickname
, Japanese actress
, Japanese actress
 Rio Ferdinand (born 1978), English football player
 Rio Gomez (born 1994), American baseball player
 Rio Haryanto (born 1993), Indonesian racing driver
, Japanese TV announcer
, Japanese actress
, Japanese playwright
 Rio Matsumoto (born 1982), Japanese actress, model and singer
 Rio Mavuba (born 1984), French football player
 Rio Natsuki (born 1969), Japanese voice actress
, Japanese gravure idol 
, Japanese footballer 
, Japanese footballer
 Rio Pangestu (born 1997), Indonesian futsal player
 Rio Reiser (1950–1996), German singer
 Rio Ruiz (born 1994), American baseball player
, Japanese child actress
, Japanese footballer 
, Japanese writer
, Japanese racing driver
, Japanese swimmer
 Rio Suzuki (born 2005), Japanese child actress
, Japanese footballer
, Japanese Gravure idol
, Japanese actress 
, Indonesian professional surfer
, Japanese wrestler
, Japanese violinist
, Japanese actress 
 Tina Yuzuki (born 1986), also known as Rio, Japanese AV idol

Surname
 Al Rio (1962–2012), Brazilian comic book artist
 Michel Rio (footballer) (born 1963), former French footballer
 Michel Rio (born 1945), French writer and novelist
 Patrice Rio (born 1948), former French footballer
 Alexis-François Rio (1797–1874), French author and art critic

Entertainment

Film
 Rio (1939 film), starring Basil Rathbone
 Rio, a 2011 animated film from 20th Century Fox and Blue Sky Studios
 Rio 2, the 2014 sequel

Television and anime
 "Rio" (CSI: Miami), the first episode in Season 5 (September 2006) of the American television program CSI: Miami
 Rio: Rainbow Gate!, a 2011 anime series based on a pachinko franchise by Tecmo

Fictional characters
 Rio, the main villain from Juken Sentai Gekiranger, a 2007 Japanese tokusatsu television series
 Rio (Money Heist), a code-name for a character in Netflix series Money Heist
 Rio, a character in the web-show NX Files, running since 2005
 Rio (Shaman King), a character in the anime series Shaman King
 Rio Futaba (双葉 理央), one of the main characters of the light novel and anime series Seishun Buta Yarō

 Rio Kastle, a character in the anime series Yu-Gi-Oh! Zexal
 Rio Kazumiya, a character in the anime series Sound of the Sky
 Rio Nakamura, a character in the anime series Assassination Classroom
 Rio Suzuki is one of the main characters from The Gods Lie.
 Rio "Rollins" Tachibana, a character who appears in the Rio: Rainbow Gate anime, as well as some titles in the Dead or Alive video games
 Rio Wellard, a character from The Story of Tracy Beaker series 4-5, portrayed by Craig Roberts

Places
 the name of a Lake District town in Swallows and Amazons, an English children's novel

Games
 Rio (video game), the 2011 tie-in game for Nintendo DS, Wii, PS3, and Xbox 360
 Angry Birds Rio, an edition of the game Angry Birds tying into the release of Rio

Music
 R.I.O. (band), a German dance band
 Los del Río, the Spanish music duo that gained international fame for their 1995 song "Macarena"
 Rock in Opposition, or RIO, a musical movement in the 1970s
 Rock in Rio, a series of music festivals held in Brazil and Portugal

Albums
 Río (Aterciopelados album), a 2008 album by Aterciopelados
 Rio (Uri Caine album), a 2001 album by Uri Caine
 Rio (Duran Duran album), a 1982 album by new wave group Duran Duran
 Rio (Keith Jarrett album), a 2011 jazz album by Keith Jarrett
 Rio (Joyce album)
 Rio (Lee Ritenour album), a 1979 jazz album by Lee Ritenour
 Rock in Rio (album), a 2001 live album by Iron Maiden
 Rush in Rio, a 2003 live album by Rush

Songs
 "Rio" (Duran Duran song), the 1982 title song from the above Duran Duran album
 "Rio" (Ledri Vula song), a 2019 song by Albanian rapper Ledri Vula
 "Rio", a song by Hey Marseilles from the 2008 album To Travels & Trunks
 "Rio", a song by Michael Nesmith from the 1977 album From a Radio Engine to the Photon Wing
 "Rio", a song by Wavelength from the 1982 album Hurry Home

Businesses and organizations
 Regional Institute of Ophthalmology, several institutes in India
 Rio All Suite Hotel and Casino, a resort in Las Vegas, US, that opened in 1990
 Rio Convention, one of several commonly used "Rio" nicknames for the 1992 Convention on Biological Diversity
 Rio (British drink), British soft drink brand
 Rio (Chinese drink), Chinese alcopop brand
 Rio Group, founded 1986, an international organization of Latin American states
 RIO Models, diecast miniature cars made in Italy
 Rio Tinto (corporation), a multinational mining and resources group founded in 1873

Politics
 Rio Declaration on Environment and Development, a 1992 global sustainable development plan
 Rio Protocol of 1942, which temporarily settled a border war between Peru and Ecuador
 Rio Treaty or Rio Pact of 1947, more formally known as the Inter-American Treaty of Reciprocal Assistance

Roles and professions
 Radar Intercept Officer, or RIO
 Railway Investigation Officer, or RIO, a rank in the Victoria Transit Patrol
 Remote interface officer (RIO) Flight Controller, integrates communications between Mission Control Center Houston and other Space Centers

Technology
 Rio (digital audio players), a brand name of a line of digital audio players
 Rio (windowing system), the windowing system for the Plan 9 from Bell Labs operating system
 Kyocera Rio, or Kyocera E3100, a mobile phone
 Reconfigurable Input/Output, or RIO, found in devices such as the CompactRIO
 Winsock RIO extensions, part of the Winsock network API
 Ford Del Rio, an American station wagon

Transportation

Air transportation
 Avian Rio, a British hang glider
 RIO, the IATA airport code for all airports near Rio de Janeiro

Automobiles
 Kia Rio, a 1999–present Korean subcompact car
 Panther Rio, a 1975–1977 British full-size sedan
 Premier Rio, a 2009–2018 Indian subcompact SUV
 Ford Del Rio, a 1957–1958 American full-size station wagon

See also
 Del Rio (disambiguation)
 Regional Health Information Organization (RHIO)
 Ríos (disambiguation)
 Rive (disambiguation)
 River (disambiguation)
 Rivers (disambiguation)
 Rivière (disambiguation)

Japanese feminine given names
Japanese unisex given names